SS Harriet Tubman (MC contract 3032) was a Liberty ship built in the United States during World War II. She was named after Harriet Tubman, an African-American abolitionist and spy during the American Civil War, and was the first Liberty ship to be named for an African-American woman.

The ship was laid down by the South Portland Shipbuilding Corporation, South Portland, Maine, on 19 April 1944, then launched on 3 June 1944. Twenty-two members of Tubman's extended family attended the launch. Eva Stuart Northrup, Tubman's great-niece, christened the ship. The ship survived the war only to suffer the same fate as nearly all other Liberty ships that survived did; she was scrapped in 1972.

References 

Liberty ships
Ships built in Portland, Maine
1944 ships
Memorials to Harriet Tubman